Borki Kosy  is a village in the administrative district of Gmina Zbuczyn, within Siedlce County, Masovian Voivodeship, in east-central Poland.

The village has an approximate population of 260. The village is located on the Warsaw - Terespol train line, and there is train station. 
There is school complex of pre-school, primary school and gymnasium. The village has a chapel and one shop.

References

Borki Kosy

pl:Borki Kosy